The canton of Le Réolais et Les Bastides is an administrative division of the Gironde department, southwestern France. It was created at the French canton reorganisation which came into effect in March 2015. Its seat is in Pineuilh.

It consists of the following communes:
 
Aillas
Auriolles
Auros
Bagas
Barie
Bassanne
Berthez
Blaignac
Blasimon
Bourdelles
Brannens
Brouqueyran
Camiran
Caplong
Casseuil
Castelmoron-d'Albret
Castelviel
Caumont
Cazaugitat
Cleyrac
Coimères
Cours-de-Monségur
Coutures
Daubèze
Dieulivol
Les Esseintes
Eynesse
Floudès
Fontet
Fossès-et-Baleyssac
Gironde-sur-Dropt
Hure
Lados
Lamothe-Landerron
Landerrouat
Landerrouet-sur-Ségur
Les Lèves-et-Thoumeyragues
Ligueux
Listrac-de-Durèze
Loubens
Loupiac-de-la-Réole
Margueron
Massugas
Mauriac
Mérignas
Mesterrieux
Mongauzy
Monségur
Montagoudin
Morizès
Neuffons
Noaillac
Pellegrue
Pineuilh
Pondaurat
Le Puy
Puybarban
La Réole
Rimons
Riocaud
Roquebrune
La Roquille
Ruch
Saint-André-et-Appelles
Saint-Antoine-du-Queyret
Saint-Avit-de-Soulège
Saint-Avit-Saint-Nazaire
Saint-Brice
Sainte-Foy-la-Grande
Sainte-Gemme
Saint-Exupéry
Saint-Félix-de-Foncaude
Saint-Ferme
Saint-Hilaire-de-la-Noaille
Saint-Hilaire-du-Bois
Saint-Martin-de-Lerm
Saint-Martin-du-Puy
Saint-Michel-de-Lapujade
Saint-Philippe-du-Seignal
Saint-Quentin-de-Caplong
Saint-Sève
Saint-Sulpice-de-Guilleragues
Saint-Sulpice-de-Pommiers
Saint-Vivien-de-Monségur
Sauveterre-de-Guyenne
Savignac
Sigalens
Soussac
Taillecavat

References

Cantons of Gironde